Robert Kozma (born 1983) is a Serbian politician and activist who has been a member of the National Assembly since 1 August 2022. He is a member of the Do not let Belgrade drown (NDB).

Biography 
Kozma was born in 1983 in Subotica, SAP Vojvodina, SR Serbia, SFR Yugoslavia. He graduated political sciences at the Faculty of Political Sciences, University of Belgrade and the Central European University in Budapest.

He has been designing and implementing programs of intercultural education and education for democracy.

Kozma has been a member of Do not let Belgrade drown (NDB) since its founding in 2015. In the 2022 general election, NDB contested as part of the We Must (Moramo) alliance and Kozma was elected member of the National Assembly.

References 

1983 births
Living people
Politicians from Subotica
University of Belgrade Faculty of Political Science alumni
Central European University alumni
Members of the National Assembly (Serbia)